Wernersville is a borough in Berks County, Pennsylvania. The population was 2,494 at the 2010 census.

Geography
Wernersville is located at  (40.329941, -76.080701).

History
In the late 19th century and early 20th century, Wernersville was a noted resort community. City dwellers (especially from Philadelphia and New York City) traveled out to Wernersville, a stop on the Reading Railroad to rest and partake of the cool mountain air of South Mountain. A number of large resort hotels were erected for this purpose including Galen Hall, Bynden Wood, Grand View and the Highland Hotel. Some were advertised as sanatoriums, specializing in rest cures for illnesses such as tuberculosis. The most famous of these was Dr. Robert Walter's Mountain Park (aka Walters Park). Most of these resort hotels have since disappeared due to fire, demolition, or have been transformed into buildings for institutional purposes. Some cottages once associated with the resorts are now private homes.

In 1891, the Wernersville State Hospital opened as the State Asylum for the Chronic Insane. The original hospital buildings remain standing and the State Hospital is still active. 

There is a Jesuit Center with a small Jesuit community here; Wernersville was once the location of the Jesuit novitiate center for the Society's Maryland Province, before the novitiates of the New York and Maryland provinces merged and it was relocated to Syracuse, New York.

The Lerch Tavern and Wertz Mill are listed on the National Register of Historic Places.

Transportation

U.S. Route 422 is the only numbered highway serving Wernersville. It follows a northwest-southeast alignment through the borough via Penn Avenue.

Demographics
As of the 2000 census, there were 2,150 people, 843 households, and 558 families living in the borough. The population density was 2,690.3 people per square mile (1,037.6/km2). There were 870 housing units at an average density of 1,088.6 per square mile (419.9/km2). The racial makeup of the borough was 97.77% White, 0.84% African American, 0.23% Native American, 0.23% Asian, 0.28% from other races, and 0.65% from two or more races. Hispanic or Latino of any race were 0.88% of the population.

There were 843 households, out of which 27.9% had children under the age of 18 living with them, 55.2% were married couples living together, 7.4% had a female householder with no husband present, and 33.7% were non-families. 28.2% of all households were made up of individuals, and 10.2% had someone living alone who was 65 years of age or older. The average household size was 2.37 and the average family size was 2.92.

In the borough the population was spread out, with 20.6% under the age of 18, 6.0% from 18 to 24, 30.8% from 25 to 44, 21.3% from 45 to 64, and 21.3% who were 65 years of age or older. The median age was 41 years. For every 100 females there were 96.5 males. For every 100 females age 18 and over, there were 94.5 males.

The median income for a household in the borough was $45,605, and the median income for a family was $54,103. Males had a median income of $37,917 versus $25,192 for females. The per capita income for the borough was $21,858. About 3.4% of families and 4.4% of the population were below the poverty line, including 8.6% of those under age 18 and 5.5% of those age 65 or over.

References

External links

Official website

Populated places established in 1914
Boroughs in Berks County, Pennsylvania